Manmarziyaan, released internationally as Husband Material, is a 2018 Indian Hindi-language romantic comedy drama film directed by Anurag Kashyap and written by Kanika Dhillon. Starring Abhishek Bachchan, Vicky Kaushal and Taapsee Pannu in lead roles. The film is jointly produced by Phantom Films and Aanand L. Rai's Colour Yellow Productions. 

Manmarziyaan began filming in February 2018. It is a love story set in Amritsar, Punjab, India. Principal photography wrapped up in April 2018. It premiered at the 2018 Toronto International Film Festival and was released in India on 14 September 2018 to positive reviews from critics.

Plot
Rumi (Taapsee Pannu), a young woman, is in love with Vicky (Vicky Kaushal), a part-time DJ. One day they are caught by Rumi’s family and pressure builds for them to get married. Rumi promises her family that Vicky will come with his parents to ask for her hand in marriage and if he doesn't show up, she will marry whomever her family chooses. However, nervous and immature, Vicky repeatedly gets cold feet.

Eventually, she gives up on him and agrees to an arranged marriage with a mature and responsible banker, Robbie (Abhishek Bachchan). Rumi accepts the proposal but the night before the wedding, refuses to marry, believing Vicky has changed. However, he backs out again.

Robbie and Rumi get married the next day. She gradually starts getting comfortable with Robbie.
One day, Vicky shows up to tell Robbie about him and Rumi, she tells Robbie that she wants to stay married to him. He still reminds her that she has a choice.
She ends up sleeping with Vicky the next day. Robbie, suspiciously, follows Rumi and ends up seeing her with Vicky. Robbie, realising that Rumi has cheated on him, gets heartbroken. When confronted, Robbie confesses that he loves Rumi but she and Vicky deserve each other. The next day, Robbie files for an annulment.

Rumi realizes that she is in love with Robbie and Vicky was never the "husband material" she was looking for. Initially reluctant, Vicky leaves Rumi.
Rumi meets Robbie in court. They sign the papers. On the way, Rumi answers the questions Robbie had asked her. Ultimately, Robbie forgives her and they reconcile.

Cast
Abhishek Bachchan as Robbie Bhatia
Vicky Kaushal as Vicky Sandhu
Taapsee Pannu as Rumi Bagga
Ashnoor Kaur as Kiran
Vishavpreet kaur as Rumi's chachi
Saurabh Sachdeva as Kakaji
Vikram Kochhar as Robbie's brother
Arun Bali as Rumi's Grandfather
Neelu Kohli as Robbie's Mother
Swairaj Sandhu as Robbie's Father
Sukhmani Sadana as Lovely Singh
Rajinder Singh as Lawyer Bhalla
Jasmine Bajwa as Keerat 
Rupinderjit Singh as Babloo 
Akshay Arora as Rumi's Chacha
Gaurav Amlani as Raja
Toranj Kayvon as Raja's Girlfriend

Production
The project was originally to be directed by Sameer Sharma, who had shot some portions of the film, but producer Aanand L. Rai was not happy with the rough cut and stopped the shooting. He then approached Ashwiny Iyer Tiwari to direct it, but she could not do it because of her "prior commitments". In November 2016, it was announced that Anurag Kashyap will now be directing Manmarziyaan written by Kanika Dhillon. Initially, it was reported by the media that Dulquer Salmaan, Ayushmann Khurrana and Bhumi Pednekar were cast in the film, but they dropped out of the film. Abhishek Bachchan was then brought in as a replacement for Dulquer Salmaan. The movie marked Bachchan's return to acting after a 2-year hiatus. The film was shot in Punjab, while some portions in Delhi and Kashmir.

Box office

Manmarziyaan was well received at the box office. It collected 4 crore on opening day. The film saw a further jump of 5.70 crore in collections on Sunday. The worldwide gross of the movie was 40.39 crore.

Reception 
Manmarziyaan received positive reviews from critics, with particular praise for its contemporary take on a love story and the overall strong performances from its cast. Additionally, it also received high praise for seamlessly weaving its soundtrack into the story. As a love-triangle with a running length of 155 minutes, the subject matter was a venture into conventional Bollywood territory for director Anurag Kashyap. 

Critic Anupama Chopra noted "director Anurag Kashyap, Hindi cinema's high-priest of darkness, turns his ferocious gaze on relationships. Obviously then, this is not the routine Bollywood meet-cute. Director Kashyap and writer Kanika Dhillon have created a fully realized world that is fueled by Amit Trivedi’s pulsating soundtrack" Times Of India's critic Rachit Gupta said "The maturity with which Anurag Kashyap’s Manmarziyaan talks about love and relationships is refreshing. The seemingly conventional story of a love triangle, gets original with its treatment and portrayal of love. With characters constantly oscillating between confusion and complex emotions, Manmarziyaan presents a new and updated look at romance and relationships."

Raja Sen, writing for Hindustan Times, critiqued the film saying "There is authenticity to the texture, but this film could have held more. It is ultimately a disappointment not because of its craft, but because of predictability, self-indulgent pace and its irritating attempt to be both a light crowd-pleaser with a cutesy ending as well as an impassioned, volatile romance." Filmfare critic Debesh Sharma adds "Shot well by Sylvester Fonseca and edited well by Aarti Bajaj, the film scores on technical fronts as well."

The movie received a limited international release with the title "Husband Material" including a premiere at the Toronto International Film Festival in September 2018.

Soundtrack 

The soundtrack of the film was composed by Amit Trivedi while the lyrics were written by Shellee except where noted.

The first song, "F for Fyaar", was released on 10 August 2018. The second song, "Daryaa", was released on 11 August 2018. The third song "Grey Walaa Shade" was released on 12 August 2018. The fourth song, "Dhyaanchand", was released on 13 August 2018. The fifth song, "Chonch Ladhiyaan", was released on 14 August 2018. The sixth song, "Hallaa", was released on 15 August 2018. The seventh song, "Sacchi Mohabbat", was released on 16 August 2018. The eighth song, "Jaisi Teri Marzi", was released on 17 August 2018. The ninth song, "Bijlee Giregi", was released on 18 August 2018. The tenth song, "Kundali", was released on 23 August 2018.

Vipin Nair of The Hindu gave the soundtrack 4/5 stating that though the "repetitiveness gets in the way on more than one occasion, the composer still manages to deliver a supremely engaging soundtrack, with ample help from Shellee and a bunch of incredible musicians." The Times of India based Debarati Sen, in her review, said the lyricist-composer combo ensures that the album "finds a way to your playlist."

Awards and nominations

References

External links
 
 

Films set in Amritsar
2018 romantic drama films
Films directed by Anurag Kashyap
Films scored by Amit Trivedi
2018 films
Indian romantic drama films